Sphelodon phoxopteridis is a species of parasitoid wasp in the family Ichneumonidae.

References

Further reading

External links

 

Parasitic wasps
Insects described in 1888